Mahi Dasht (also Romanized as Māhī Dasht) is a village in Fahraj Rural District, in the Central District of Fahraj County, Kerman Province, Iran. At the 2006 census, its population was 257, in 59 families.

References 

Populated places in Fahraj County